The 2010 Russian Second Division  was the third strongest division in Russian football. The Second Division is geographically divided into 5 zones.
The winners of each zone are automatically promoted into the First Division. The bottom finishers of each zone lose professional status and are relegated into the Amateur Football League.

West

Standings

Top scorers
Source: PFL 
21 goals
Artur Sarkisov (Lokomotiv-2)

18 goals
Dmitri Vyazmikin (Torpedo Vladimir)

11 goals
Aleksei Pugin (Dynamo Vologda)

10 goals
Konstantin Ionov (Torpedo-ZIL)
Aleksandr Petukhov (Sever)
Pavel Vtyurin (Torpedo Vladimir)

9 goals
Valeri Malyshev (Torpedo Vladimir)
Radik Safin (Pskov-747)

Center

Standings

Top scorers
Source: PFL 
20 goals
Yevgeni Polyakov (Rusichi)

19 goals
Andrei Myazin (Vityaz)

15 goals
Ilya Borodin (Zvezda)
Denis Kirilenko (Gubkin)

13 goals
Sergei Faustov (Gubkin / Fakel)

11 goals
Yegor Larionov (Saturn-2 / Znamya Truda)

South
FC Bataysk-2007 dropped out of the competition on July 31 due to lack of finances. All their opponents in the remaining scheduled matches were awarded a 3-0 win.

Standings

Top scorers
Source: PFL 
16 goals
 Pavel Safronov (Mashuk-KMV)

13 goals
 Aleksandr Golubev (Astrakhan)
 Timirlan Shavanov (Dagdizel)
 Dmitri Shovgenov (Kavkaztransgaz-2005)
 Roman Smolskiy (MITOS)

12 goals
 Aleksei Buznyakov (SKA)

10 goals
 Sergei Grinenko (Astrakhan)
 Zhumaldin Karatlyashev (Chernomorets)
  Roman Uzdenov (Druzhba)

9 goals
 Vasili Brovin (Dynamo)
 Batraz Kaloyev (Beslan-FAYUR)
 Vadim Luchin (Angusht)
 Valentin Okorochkov (Chernomorets)

Ural-Povolzhye

Standings

Top scorers
Source: PFL 
19 goals
Mikhail Tyufyakov (Neftekhimik)

17 goals
Marat Shogenov (Gazovik)

11 goals
Aleksandr Korotayev (Akademiya)
Viktor Zemchenkov (Tyumen)

10 goals
Vladimir Morozov (Chelyabinsk)

9 goals
Konstantin Nizovtsev (Gazovik)

East

Standings

Top scorers
Source: PFL 

19 goals
 Valentin Yegunov (Metallurg-Kuzbass)

14 goals
 Aleksei Bazanov (Metallurg-Yenisey)

11 goals
 Maksim Bondarenko (Sakhalin)
 Vladimir Nakhanovich (Radian-Baikal)
 Denis Uryvkov (Metallurg-Kuzbass)

9 goals
 Georgy Garmashov (Chita)
 Kirill Kochkayev (Chita)
 Sergei Narylkov (Dynamo)
 Aleksei Nekrasov (Radian-Baikal)
 Eduard Uchurov (Radian-Baikal)
 Sergei Voronov (KUZBASS)

8 goals
 Stanislav Goncharov (Metallurg-Yenisey)
 Andrei Lodis (Smena)

References

External links
Official PFL site 

3
Russian Second League seasons
Russia
Russia